Al Young (1939–2021) was an American writer.

Al Young may also refer to:

Al Young (American football, born 1902) (1902–1980), football player in the National Football League
Al Young (wide receiver) (born 1949), gridiron football wide receiver
Al Young (dragster driver) (born 1946), former drag racer
Al Young (politician) (born 1942), American politician in Oregon
Alfred F. Young (1925–2012), American historian

See also
Albert Young (disambiguation)
Alfred Young (disambiguation)
Alan Young (disambiguation)